The Fall of Harran refers to the siege and capture of the Assyrian city of Harran by the Median and Neo-Babylonian empires.

Background
From the year 639 BC, the Neo-Assyrian Empire had been suffering from a decline in their power, culminating in Babylonian and Median invasions of their lands. The city of Arrapha fell in 615 BC, followed by Assur in 614 BC, and finally the famed Nineveh, the newest capital of Assyria, in 612 BC. Despite the brutal massacres that followed, the Assyrians survived as a political entity and escaped to Harran under their new king, Ashur-uballit II. Establishing Harran as a capital for the Assyrians caught the attention of the Babylonian King Nabopolassar and Median King Cyaxares, who were determined to forever destroy the threat of Assyrian resurgence.

Siege

Assyrian annals record no more after 610 BC - the presumed date of the siege. The siege lasted for another year before the city finally fell in 609 BC.

Aftermath
With the fall of Harran, the Assyrian empire ceased to exist as a state. Remnants of the former Assyrian empire's army met up with the Egyptian forces that had won at Megiddo. In 605 BC, the Babylonians were again successful, as they defeated Egyptians along with part of the army of former Assyria at Carchemish, ending the Egyptian intervention in the Near East.

References

Harran
Harran
Harran
610 BC
7th century BC
Harran
7th century BC in Assyria
History of Şanlıurfa Province
Harran